Digital Forensics, Research and Analytics Center better known as Dfrac.org or DFRAC is an Indian non-profit fact checking website founded by Dr. Shujaat Ali Quadri as Editor and Prashant Tandon as Advisor in 2021.

Famous works 

November 2021, Fact Check on Devi Chitralekha marry a Muslim man.

April 2022, Report on the list Of Fabricated stories of Sudhir Chaudhary and Zee News.

June 2022, Report on Prophet Row: Analysing the Pakistan-Based Disinformation Campaign.

September 2022, Report on Arshdeep to Shami: How are the Pakistani Twitterati fueling wrath against Indian cricketers?

September 2022, Fact Check on untouchability and caste system arise during the rule of Mughals and British.

September 2022, Fact Check on Chitra Tripathi ran a misleading post about giving a speech in Parliament of the United Kingdom.

References 

Fact-checking websites
Indian news websites
News agencies based in India
Indian journalism organisations
Internet properties established in 2021
2021 establishments in Delhi